Vice Society is a hacking group known for ransomware extortion attacks on healthcare and educational organizations. They are believed to be Russian-speaking. They have attacked targets in both Europe and the United States, including a major compromise of the Los Angeles Unified School District.

According to the U.S. Cybersecurity and Infrastructure Security Agency, Vice Society have not developed their own in-house attack tools, instead using the Hello Kitty/Five Hands and Zeppelin ransomware toolkits.

References 

Hacker groups